Porto Tolle is a town in the province of Rovigo, Veneto, northern Italy.

Twin towns
Porto Tolle is twinned with:

  Medulin, Croatia, since 2010
  Trecate, Italy, since 2010

References

Cities and towns in Veneto